This is a list of beatified individuals or blesseds according to the Catholic Church.  The list is in alphabetical order by Christian name but, if necessary, by surname, the place or attribute part of name as well.

See also

Chronological list of saints and blesseds
Beatification
List of people beatified by Pope John Paul II
List of saints
List of venerated Catholics
List of Servants of God
List of saints of India

External links
Catholic Online list of saints and blesseds
Patron Saints Index

!
Beautified people